WEC 24: Full Force was a mixed martial arts event held on October 12, 2006. WEC 24's main event was a championship fight for the WEC Lightweight Title between champion Hermes Franca and challenger Nate Diaz.

Results

Miscelleaneous
This was the WEC's last event before being purchased by Zuffa, LLC, the parent company of the Ultimate Fighting Championship. It was also the last WEC card to feature matches in the heavyweight division, which was shut down (along with the super-heavyweight division) after Zuffa purchased the company.

See also
 World Extreme Cagefighting
 List of World Extreme Cagefighting champions
 List of WEC events
 2006 in WEC

External links
Event Results on Sherdog
Official WEC website

World Extreme Cagefighting events
2006 in mixed martial arts
Mixed martial arts in California
Sports in Lemoore, California
2006 in sports in California